Corseul (Gallo: Corsoeut) is a commune in the Côtes-d'Armor department of Brittany in northwestern France.

The town was a major Roman town and contains Roman ruins. The town hall contains a small archaeological museum.

History
Corseul was called Fanum Martis ("Temple of Mars") in Latin and was the capital of the Gallo-Roman province of Coriosolites. It was founded in 10 BC. In the 3rd and 4th centuries, like many other cities, Fanum Martis was renamed for its people, the Curiosolitae. This name change occurred as the Roman Empire weakened and paralleled a revival of the ancient Gallic gods in local religious sculptures and dedicatory inscriptions.

Some 1.5 kilometres to the southeast, at Haut-Bécherel, stand the prominent remains of an extensive Roman temple sanctuary, built at the time of Nero and Vespasian.

Population

Inhabitants of Corseul are called coriosolites or curiosolites in French.

See also
Communes of the Côtes-d'Armor department

References

External links

Communes of Côtes-d'Armor
Curiosolitae
Gallia Lugdunensis